The men's javelin throw at the 2019 World Athletics Championships was held at the Khalifa International Stadium in Doha, Qatar, on 5 and 6 October 2019.

Summary
The automatic qualification to the final was 84.00 metres.  One and done, on his first throw Johannes Vetter beat that by over 5 metres with an 89.35m.  In the second group, world leader Magnus Kirt took two attempts to make his mark of 88.36m.  Either of those throws would have won the final easily.

In the second round, Vetter and Kirt got respectable marks with 85.37m and 86.21m respectively. From that point, nobody would improve. Fourth place Lassi Etelätalo was almost 3 metres off the podium. In the fourth round, Peters duplicated his winning first round throw with another 86.69m.  #8 in the world rankings coming in, Peters took gold.

Records
Before the competition records were as follows:

Schedule
The event schedule, in local time (UTC+3), is as follows:

Results

Qualification
Qualification: Qualifying Performance 84.00 (Q) or at least 12 best performers (q) advanced to the final.

Final
The final was started on 6 October at 19:57.

References

Men's javelin throw
Javelin throw at the World Athletics Championships